Anthony Delhalle (11 January 1982 – 9 March 2017) was a French Grand Prix motorcycle racer. He rode a Suzuki GSX-R1000 in the FIM CEV Superbike European Championship and the Endurance FIM World Championship. He died on 9 March 2017, after falling from his bike during a test on the Circuit Paul Armagnac near Nogaro and breaking his neck.

Career statistics

By season

Races by year

References

External links

1982 births
2017 deaths
French motorcycle racers
Moto2 World Championship riders